The Samsung Galaxy J2 Prime (also known as Galaxy J2 Ace, Galaxy Grand Prime or Galaxy Grand Prime Plus) is an Android-based smartphone manufactured by Samsung Electronics. It was unveiled and released in November 2016.

Specifications

Hardware 
The J2 Prime is powered by MediaTek MT6737T SoC including a quad-core 1.4 GHz ARM Cortex-A53 CPU, an ARM Mali-T720MP2 GPU and 1.5 GB RAM. The 8 GB internal storage can be upgraded up to 256 GB via microSD card.

The J2 Prime features a 5-inch PLS TFT with a 540×960 px resolution. It has an 8 megapixels main camera with f/2.2 aperture, LED flash and autofocus. The front camera is a 5 MP sensor with f/2.2 aperture and LED flash.

Software 
The Galaxy J2 Prime is shipped with Android 6.0.1 "Marshmallow" and Samsung's TouchWiz user interface

.

See also 
 Samsung Galaxy
 Samsung Galaxy J series

References 

Android (operating system) devices
Samsung smartphones
Mobile phones introduced in 2016
Samsung Galaxy
Discontinued smartphones
Mobile phones with user-replaceable battery